Hordes of Chaos is the twelfth studio album by German thrash metal band Kreator.

It has been described as their most organic album to date because, barring vocals, guitar solos and some melodies, the album was recorded in a live setting on an analog tape recorder with few overdubs. Frontman Mille Petrozza noted that this was the first time they have recorded an album this way since Pleasure to Kill in 1986. He described the album as "it combines the best moments of our back catalogue with the intensity and experience of 2009". Hordes of Chaos also marked the first time since its inception that Kreator had not changed their lineup after at least two albums.

The album was released in three different formats. The standard edition was issued in a jewel case and features the 10 album tracks. A deluxe edition features a bonus DVD with a making of the album documentary. The LP version of the album has different artwork to the other versions.

This was the first Kreator album to chart in the United States, debuting at number 165 on the Billboard 200 chart in the US, with first week sales of approximately 2,800 copies.

Re-release 
The album was re-released as the 'Ultra Riot' box set edition in mid-2010. It featured new artwork, extended liner notes by Joel McIver, promo videos, a bonus disc with demo tracks and cover songs and various pieces of memorabilia (such as a photobook, sticker, poster and photo card).

Track listing

Credits 
Kreator
 Mille Petrozza – vocals, rhythm guitar
 Sami Yli-Sirniö – lead guitar
 Christian Giesler – bass
 Ventor – drums

Production
 Moses Schneider – production
 Colin Richardson – mixing
 Joachim Luetke – artwork

Charts

References

External links 
 

2009 albums
Kreator albums
SPV/Steamhammer albums